Raphael Louis Zengel  (11 November 189427 February 1977) was an American-born Canadian recipient of the Victoria Cross, the highest and most prestigious award for valour in the face of the enemy that can be awarded to British and Commonwealth forces.

Early life
Zengel was born at Faribault, Minnesota. As a young boy, he and his mother Mary moved to a homestead near the village of Plunkett, Saskatchewan. He enlisted in the Canadian Expeditionary Force in July 1915.

Victoria Cross
Zengel received the Military Medal in March 1918 for taking command of his platoon when his officer and sergeant had been put out of action. He was 23 years old, and a sergeant of the 5th (Western Cavalry) Battalion, Canadian Expeditionary Force, during the First World War, when on 9 August 1918 east of Warvillers, France, he performed the deed for which he was awarded the Victoria Cross.

The citation reads:

Retirement

After the war, Zengel lived in Calgary, Alberta, where he joined the Calgary Fire Department in 1919 and served until 1927.

Sergeant Zengel spent most of the rest of his life in the town Rocky Mountain House, Alberta, where the local branch of the Royal Canadian Legion has been named in his honour. He donated his Victoria Cross to the Rocky Mountain House Legion where it is kept in a safety box.  and only a replica of his Victoria Cross along with the rest of his medals are on display. His headstone can be found at Pine Grove Cemetery, Rocky Mountain House, Canada.

Legacy
In 1936, the government of Canada chose to name a lake in northeastern Saskatchewan in Zengel's honour. Inexplicably, the feature became Zengle Lake, and so it remains today (2007). In 1951, one of the mountains of the Victoria Cross Range, in Jasper National Park, was named in his honour. Mount Zengel is visible from Highway 16, east of Jasper, Alberta.

References

External links 
 Raphael Zengel's digitized service file
 Legion Magazine
 List of Canadian Victoria Cross recipients

1894 births
1977 deaths
Canadian World War I recipients of the Victoria Cross
Canadian recipients of the Military Medal
Canadian military personnel of World War I
People from Faribault, Minnesota
American emigrants to Canada
Canadian Expeditionary Force soldiers
Military personnel from Minnesota